Los Angeles City Council District 8 is one of the 15 districts of the Los Angeles City Council, representing much of western South Los Angeles.  

The current council member is Marqueece Harris-Dawson, who took office on 1 July 2015.  The preceding council member was Bernard C. Parks, from 2003 to June 2015.

Geography

Present day district

The 8th District includes the neighborhoods of: Baldwin Hills, Chesterfield Square, Crenshaw, Jefferson Park, and other communities of western South Los Angeles.

Los Angeles City Council District 9 represents neighborhoods and communities in eastern South Los Angeles.

For all the communities represented, see the official City of Los Angeles map of District 8.

Historical locations

A new city charter effective in 1925 replaced the former "at large" voting system for a nine-member council with a district system with a 15-member council. Each district was to be approximately equal in population, based upon the voting in the previous gubernatorial election; thus redistricting was done every four years. (At present, redistricting is done every ten years, based upon the preceding U.S. census results.) The numbering system established in 1925 for City Council districts began with No. 1 in the north of the city, the San Fernando Valley, and ended with No. 15 in the south, the Harbor area.

As the city's population expanded to the west, the 8th District's boundaries gradually shifted that way as well. Areas covered over the years have been:

1925: South of Washington Street, north of Jefferson on the western side and north of Slauson Avenue on the eastern side, bounded on the east by Alameda Street and the Vernon city line.

1926: Bounded by 47th Street, Vermont Avenue, Florence Avenue and Alameda Street.

1928: Same as before, with the addition of an area bounded by Central Avenue, Manchester Avenue, Vermont Avenue and Florence Avenue.

1929: "Extreme southwest."

1932–33: ". . . due to the exceptional growth of the western part of the city, a general movement toward the ocean was necessary." East boundary: Central Avenue. North: Vernon Avenue. West: Vermont Avenue. South: Century Boulevard.

1935: Roughly the same as in 1932.

1937: North: 45th Street or 48th  Street. East: Alameda Street. South: Manchester Avenue. West: Vermont Avenue.

1940: "The general trend is westward and northeastward, due to heavy construction in the San Fernando Valley and the beach areas." 
In 1940, the 8th District was bounded on the north by Vernon Avenue, on the west by  Western Avenue, on the east by the city limits or Alameda Street and on the south by about Slauson Avenue.

1955: ". . . bordering on Huntington Park and Vernon, from Vernon Avenue to 94th Street. . . . A considerable percentage of the population is Negro; they hold that their race should have some representation in the City Council. On the other hand, left-wing Democrats, following the banner of Rep. Jimmy Roosevelt, also have a candidate in the race, which may split the Negro vote."

1964: Enlarged by absorbing two-thirds of the old 12th District, which was moved to the San Fernando Valley because of the growth of population there.

1971.  Runs "from Adams Blvd. through the south central city to around Century Blvd. and includes parts of Watts.

1975: "The district runs in a north-south line in South-Central Los Angeles, from Adams and Jefferson Blvds. on the north, to Normandie and Central Avenue on the west, 118th St. on the south, and Arlington and Van Ness on the west. . . . [It] suffers some of the worst crime, unemployment and housing problems in the city."

1992: Line had shifted west to include Marlton Square on Crenshaw Boulevard. as well as Baldwin Hills.

Officeholders

The 8th District has been represented by 9 council members.

See also
Los Angeles City Council districts
List of Los Angeles municipal election returns
Los Angeles City Council

References

Note: Access to most of these links requires the use of a LAPL library card.

External links
 Official Los Angeles City Council District 8—Councilmember Marqueece Harris-Dawson website
 Detailed city street map showing District 8 boundaries

LACD08
South Los Angeles
Baldwin Hills, Los Angeles 
Crenshaw, Los Angeles
Jefferson Park, Los Angeles
West Adams, Los Angeles